Maxim Valeryevich Shalunov (born 31 January 1993) is a Russian professional ice hockey player with Lokomotiv Yaroslavl of the Kontinental Hockey League (KHL).  Shalunov was selected in the 4th round (109th overall) by the Chicago Blackhawks in the 2011 NHL Entry Draft.  He was born in Chelyabinsk, Russia.

Playing career
Shalunov grew up playing youth hockey in Russia.

During the 2010–11 MHL season, Shalunov played with the Belye Medvedi, the Junior Hockey League (MHL) team, which contains hockey players from the school affiliated with the Traktor Chelyabinsk KHL team.  He also played six games with Traktor in the KHL during the 2010–11 KHL season.

After being drafted by the Blackhawks, Shalunov returned to Russia and played the 2011–12 MHL season with Belye Medvedi.  During the 2012-2013 season, Shalunov's time was divided between Belye Medvedi as well as Traktor's VHL team, Chelmet Chelyabinsk.  He also played one game with Traktor.

Shalunov played in North America during the 2013–14 season. He started the season with the Rockford IceHogs, the Blackhawks' American Hockey League affiliate. After registering four assists in twenty games with Rockford, Shalunov was assigned to the Toledo Walleye, the Blackhawks' ECHL affiliate where he contributed with 18 goals and 34 points in 43 games.

On July 28, 2014, Shalunov returned to his native Russia, signing a one-year contract with HC Sibir Novosibirsk of the KHL.

After the 2016–17 season, his third year with Novosibirsk, Shalunov was traded along with Sergei Shumakov and Konstantin Okulov to HC CSKA Moscow in exchange for Alexander Sharov and financial compensation on the opening day of free agency on May 1, 2017.

Shalunov left CSKA after four seasons with the club, signing as a free agent to a three-year contract with Lokomotiv Yaroslavl on 9 August 2021.

Career statistics

Regular season and playoffs

International

Awards and honors

References

External links

1993 births
Living people
Sportspeople from Chelyabinsk
Belye Medvedi Chelyabinsk players
Chicago Blackhawks draft picks
HC CSKA Moscow players
Lokomotiv Yaroslavl players
Rockford IceHogs (AHL) players
Russian ice hockey centres
HC Sibir Novosibirsk players
Toledo Walleye players
Traktor Chelyabinsk players